Taiwan Fellowship Editor is an open-source WYSIWYG and free editor based on CMS of Project Gutenberg to be used for editing and formatting online paperback and e-books. Taiwan Fellowship is regarded as an efficient online tool for authorized editors and accredited publishers to use in their work-flow while working on both Paperback books and e-Books structured in Amazon's Cloud Computing Center. It is developed by EHanism Global Corporation, an IT Service company in June 2012.

Description
Taiwan Fellowship Editor has adopted the most advanced publishing tools in a creative way based on the HTML5 attribute ContentEditable without any Traditional markup, reload, iframe or browser specific editing. The core of Taiwan Fellowship Editor is on JavaScript. Taiwan Fellowship Editor has been dedicating on the implementation of its functionality respecting the HTML5 Specification.

API
Taiwan Fellowship Editor consists of a plugin API for extensions.

Browser compatibility
Taiwan Fellowship Editor does not require specific browser for cloud editing. It is compatible across multiple browsers and operating systems including Internet Explorer, Mozilla Firefox, Safari, Google Chrome and Opera.

References

External links
 

Free HTML editors
JavaScript-based HTML editors